Salamanca is a province of western Spain, in the western part of the autonomous community of Castile and León (Castilla y León). It is bordered by the provinces of Zamora, Valladolid, Ávila, and Cáceres, and on the west by Portugal. It has an area of 12,349 km² and in 2018 had a population of 331,473 people. It is divided into 362 municipalities, 11 comarcas, 32 mancomunidades and five judicial districts. Of the 362 municipalities, more than half are villages with fewer than 300 people.

History
The Vettones occupied the areas of the current Spanish provinces of Salamanca and Ávila, as well as parts of Cáceres, Toledo and Zamora. They were a pre-Roman people of Celtic culture. Their numerous archaeological sites exist throughout the province, and several locality names have Vettone origin, some of which are quite important. This is the case of  Salamanca (Salmantica), Ledesma (Bletisama) and Ciudad Rodrigo (Augustobriga). Vettone villages were often established on the banks of rivers or on mountains. Examples include Salamanca and Ledesma, built along the Tormes, Bermellar, El Castillo (Saldeana) Moncalvo (Hinojosa de Duero), Picon de la Mora (Picones) and Castro de Yecla la Vieja (Yecla de Yeltes) next to Huebra, Ciudad Rodrigo, Irueña (Fuenteguinaldo) and Lerilla (Zamarra) on the banks of the Agueda and Castro de Las Merchanas (Lumbrales), in a loop of the Camaces. The area between La Armuña and Salamanca marked the border between Vettones and Vaccaei, the other pre-Roman people of the province. They were situated in the northeast area of the province.

Geography
Salamanca Province is situated in western Spain, in the western part of Castile and León. It has average altitude of 823 meters, but there are large variations throughout the province, with  being the highest point at the peak of the Ceja Canchal in the Sierra de Béjar range, and  being the lowest point in the valley of the Salto de Saucelle. Also of note is the Sierra de Francia mountain range. The Salamanca hydrographic network is mainly formed by the Duero basin. The most important rivers are the Duero, Tormes, Águeda, Huebra, and Yeltes rivers.

The region is well-irrigated with a number of dams and reservoirs, and with more 3,400 million cubic meters, it is the province with the third highest water storage capacity in Spain, second only to the Province of Badajoz and the Province of Cáceres. Of particular note is the Almendra Dam, five kilometres from the village of Almendra. Constructed between 1964 and 1970, the dam forms part of the hydroelectric system known as the Duero Drops, along with the Castro, Ricobayo, Saucelle and Villalcampo.

Population development
The historical population is given in the following chart:

Landmarks
There are Roman Catholic cathedrals at Salamanca and Ciudad Rodrigo. The Old Cathedral of Salamanca was founded by Bishop Jerome of Périgord, in the 12th century and completed in Romanesque/Gothic style in the 14th century. It is dedicated to Santa Maria de la Sede (Saint Mary of the See). The New Cathedral of Salamanca was constructed between the 16th and 18th centuries in the Late Gothic and Baroque styles. Building began in 1513 and the cathedral was consecrated in 1733. It was commissioned by Ferdinand V of Castile of Spain. It was declared a national monument by royal decree in 1887.

See also
 List of municipalities in Salamanca
 Kingdom of León

Notes and references

External links